The V40 fragmentation grenade was manufactured in the Netherlands, and was in service in the Canadian Forces and the US Armed Forces.

It has a safety pin and safety lever with a safety clip attached to the safety lever.

The steel body of the grenade has 326 squares pressed into its inside face to produce
separate fragments when the explosive fill is detonated. Fuse delay time was four seconds.

It was commonly referred to as the Mini-Frag.

Due to its small size, a considerable number could be carried; however, its small size also made the weapon dangerous when wearing gloves, as the impact of the striker on the primer was difficult to feel. These grenades were in service from the late 1960s to at least 2008.

References

Fragmentation grenades
Hand grenades of the United States